Rifkind is a surname. Notable people with the surname include:

Carole Rifkind (1935–2019), American architectural critic, historian and educator
Gabrielle Rifkind (born 1953), British psychotherapist and group analyst working in conflict resolution in the Middle East
Hugo Rifkind (born 1977), writer for The Times, son of Malcolm
Malcolm Rifkind (born 1946), British Conservative MP and government minister
Richard Rifkind (1930–2019), American cancer researcher
Simon H. Rifkind (1901–1995), United States federal judge and trial lawyer
Steve Rifkind, American music entrepreneur, founder and chairman of Loud Records and of SRC Records

See also
Paul, Weiss, Rifkind, Wharton & Garrison, American law firm
Rifkin, a surname and list of people with the name

Jewish surnames
Germanic-language surnames
Matronymic surnames
Yiddish-language surnames